Eva Davies (25 December 1924 – 2 December 2013) was a British fencer. She competed in the women's team foil event at the 1968 Summer Olympics.

References

1924 births
2013 deaths
British female fencers
Olympic fencers of Great Britain
Fencers at the 1968 Summer Olympics
Sportspeople from London